The Cold Synagogue or Školišča Synagogue was a wooden synagogue located in Mogilev near the intersection of Vyalikaja Hramadzianskaya (now Grażdanskaya) and Pravaya Naberezhnaya Streets. It was established around 1680. There was a cheder next to the synagogue. The interior was almost entirely covered with magnificent polychromes made in 1740s by the Słuck painter Chaim ben Yitzchak ha-Levi Segal. In the beginning of the 20th century, several ethnographic expeditions, by Alexander Miller, S. An-sky and Solomon Yudovin, and by El Lissitzky and Issachar Ber Ryback documented and photographed interiors of the synagogue. After the article by Lissitzky, interior murals of the synagogue became quite famous in artistic circles. It was decided in 1918 that the synagogue was covered by legal protection by the state authorities, but despite of it the synagogue was closed in 1938 and then dismantled by the authorities. The photos, drawings, and article by El Lissitzky is almost all evidence that preserved.

History 
The Cold Synagogue (named Cold because was unheated in winter), considered the most important in Mogilev, was built around 1680. It was located near the intersection of Vyalikaja Hramadzianskaya and Pravaya Naberezhnaya Streets, in the Jewish district of Školišča (literally "School district"), in a place marked today with a symbolic menorah (at the back of the preserved synagogue in Školišča, next to the blue gazebo erected on the occasion of the anniversary of the local water supply company).

In 1918, by one of the first decrees of the new Soviet government, the synagogue was recognized as a monument of the past and placed under state protection. Later it turned out to be the last stronghold of Jewish religious life in Mogilev and was closed in 1937. In 1938, it was dismantled into logs used for wells. Images of Segal's frescoes remained only in photographs and drawings by Ryback and Lissitzky. Lissitzky’s original copies of the Mohilev synagogue decorations have been lost. They were reproduced in the journal that published his article and reprinted in many books on the cultural heritage of East European Jewry. They remain among Lissitzky’s most frequently reproduced works.

Architecture 
The synagogue building was a wooden structure built on a stone foundation. It was a typical example of wooden synagogues in the Polish–Lithuanian Commonwealth, very few of which preserved (most were destroyed in wars, pogroms, or by Soviet authorities). The walls of the Cold Synagogue were cut from edged logs into a clean corner. The central log house was dominant in height, to which side log houses were adjoined as covered galleries. A pentagonal structure was added to the main facade, which covered the main entrance. The building was covered with a high gable roof, with a complex plan and numerous outbuildings. In the end of 19th - beginning of 20th century the roof was covered with tin.

The most detailed memoirs of the synagogue are in the article by El Lissitzky:

Ethnographic expeditions 

First known ethnographic expedition that visited Mogilev was by archaeologist and ethnographer  in 1908. In 1913, S. An-sky, founder of Jewish Historical Ethnographic Society, together with artist and photographer , also visited Cold Synagogue. Some photos made by Miller and Yudovin are now in the Russian Museum of Ethnography in Saint Petersburg.

According to published data, attention was drawn to the synagogue and its murals in 1913-1914 after the expedition by El Lissitzky and Issachar Ber Ryback, famous representatives of avant-garde art movement, and an article by an influential art critic Rachel Wischnitzer, published in the Volume XI of "History of the Jewish People", "History of the Jewish People in Russia", in 1914 along with several photographs of the paintings. Some researchers argue that this expedition was also sponsored and commissioned by S. An-sky's Jewish Historical Ethnographic Society, while others said that there are no evidence of that.

Interior murals

Chaim Segal 

The interior was almost entirely covered with magnificent polychromes made in 1740 by the Slutzk painter Chaim ben Yitzchak ha-Levi Segal. It is unusual that the name of the mural painter is known, the only reason to that is the inscriptions that Chaim Segal made on the walls of the synagogue.

First inscription, on a cartouche at the springing or base of the dome on the entrance side said:

The text continues on a shield below:

The first inscription contains a chronogram of the Hebrew year, that corresponds to 1740.

Description 

Segal's murals, made on boards, represented the images of 12 signs of the zodiac, arabesques, mythical animals and cities. Wischnitzer and Lissitzky wrote about the decorations at length.

Chaim Segal and Marc Chagall 
Marc Chagall claimed that Chaim Segal was his great-grandfather, and compared his own art to Segal's synagogue murals:

Most modern researches doubt it, and there is no evidence that Chagall had ever seen any murals that Segal created. It's also possible that elter-zeyde ("great-grandfather" in Yiddish) simply means "forefather" or "ancestor" with no hereditary commitment.

El Lissitzky and Issachar Ber Ryback's expedition 

The description and copies of the paintings were left in an article dedicated to Jewish art, "On the Mogilev Shul: Recollections", by El Lissitzky, who visited Mogilev with his colleague-artist Issachar Ber Ryback. They toured a number of cities and towns of the Belarusian Dnieper region and Lithuania in order to identify and fix on photo the monuments of Jewish antiquity. Lissitzky's article on the Cold Synagogue was published in 1923 in Berlin by the Jewish magazine Rimon–Milgroim.

In the work of Rachel Wischnitzer, the painting of the Mogilev synagogue is compared with the paintings of the synagogues in Yablonovo and Kopys. Moreover, the Yablonov painting is assessed by the author higher than the painting by Chaim Segal, at least "in terms of the selection of ornamental material." Lissitzky wrote enthusiastically and emotionally describing elements of wall painting. Here is his first impression of what he saw: "No, this was something different from that first surprise I received when I visited the Roman basilicas, the Gothic cathedrals, the Baroque churches of Germany, France, and Italy. Maybe, when a child awakens in a crib that is covered with a veil upon which flies and butterflies are sitting and the entire thing is drenched by the sun, maybe the child sees something like that."

Lissitzky's assessment of the skill of Chaim Segal is also very different in comparison with that given by Rachel Wischnitzer: "The treasury of forms used by the painter is inexhaustible. One sees how it all flowed from him, as from a cornucopia, and how the hand of the virtuoso never grew tired and never allowed itself to be outpaced by the speed of thought. On the back of the holy ark I discovered the first sketches in pencil of the outline of the entire painting, which served as the foundation of the later work in paint. This outline was sketched on the wall by a master with intense confidence, for whom the pencil is perfectly under the control of his will."

Further, about Chaim Segal, El Lissitzky mentions a common legend told about the old masters who created a kind of miracle: "People say that he painted three shuls. In Mogilev, Kopust, and in Dolhinov (others recall a different location for the latter). After he had finished, he fell from the scaffolding and died. Each shtetl tells the story about itself: the Mogilevers say he died in Mogilev, the Kapusters—in Kopust, the Dolhinevers—there. The last two shuls burned down. The Dolhinov burned long ago; my father used to say that he remembered a giant fresco in it of the burial of Jacob with a wagon, horses, the sons of Jacob, Egyptians, etc. Today we cannot compare. But the story is characteristic for our understanding of the artist. His work was so great that his continued life could only diminish him. Once his work was completed his soul had no more reason to be in his body."

Lissitzky finished his article about the synagogue with a statement: "That which is called art is created when one does not know that what one is doing is art. Only then does it remain as a memorial to culture. Today art is created through those who fight against it."

The description of the synagogue made by El Lissitzky is well illustrated by the sketch drawing of Issachar Ber Ryback. Art historian Ruth Apter-Gabriel, curator of the Israel Museum in Jerusalem, calls this drawing "the first and only one of its kind, giving an idea of the plot of the ceiling of the famous the Mogilev synagogue ... and living evidence of the search for modernist Jewish art in Russia during the revolution." The researcher notes that, despite the sketchy drawing of Ryback, it is an invaluable visual addition to the text of Lissitzky. Many details from Lissitzky's description can be easily identified, such as the Ark, lions, signs of the Zodiac or the Tree of Life. Ryback's drawing is not only easily compared with Lissitzky's description, but also fills in unknown parts of the plot.

"Of course, one can regret the sketchiness of the drawing," writes Ruth Apter-Gabriel, and one of her explanations is the artist's desire to convey the idea of the plot of the ceiling painting as a whole. Another version, she believes, is the possibility that the drawing is actually not a sketch of a ceiling painting, but a preparatory composition for future work.

"Jewish period" was very short in the art of Lissitzky, though many of his works were inspired by Jewish folk art; on the contrary, for Issachar Ber Ryback everyday life of a Jewish shtetl became the foundation of his art.

Lissitzky and Ryback also visited the synagogue of Kopys, located 50 km north of Mogilev, with very similar decoration by the hand of the same master - Chaim Segal.

Juspa the Schammes of Worms

Rachel Wischnitzer proposed that Chaim Segal was inspired for this set of three panels by the stories No. 1 and 15 from the Ma’aseh nissim (Hebrew: Story of Wonders), tales of Juspa Schammes of the Worms Synagogue, written in 1670 and published for the first time in 1696 in Amsterdam. Segal can be acquainted with the Juspa's stories from a book or from hearsay; it is also possible that he had travelled to Worms, as the inscriptions speaks of travels of "many days in the lands of the living". He may also had travelled in Galicia, were a lot of painted wooden synagogues exists at the time. Some of the motifs he used in the Mogilev synagogue, like the bear climbing on a tree for honey and the fox carrying away a goose, resembles murals in the synagogues in Jablonow and Kamianka Strumilova.

First panel depicts the punishment of Worms; two other panels conclude this story from a Messianic perspective. One depicts a boat sailing towards Jerusalem. Second – a nest of storks that rests in the Tree of Knowledge, and a mother stork bringing a snake to her young, who already hold snakes in their bills. Near the Tree – an architectural structure in the form of a tower on wheels: the image of the biblical Ark of the Covenant on the way to Jerusalem. Storks on the Tree of Knowledge symbolize true righteous people who are able to defeat snakes, that is, satanic forces. The symbol is based on the consonance of the words "Hasidim" ("righteous") and "Hassida" ("stork") in the Hebrew language.

In story No. 1, Juspa tells how the city of Worms was punished for the refusal of its wise men in exile to return to Jerusalem. Historian Shlomo Eidelberg of the Yeshiva University in New York notes that on the mural of the Cold Synagogue the name "Worms" on the tower was spelled the same way as in Juspa's book - ווירמש. The city of Jerusalem is labeled as ירושלים עיר הקודש (the Holy City of Jerusalem).

In story No. 15, Juspa wrote the legend about the dragon, and stated that because of the lint wurm the city was named "Worms": 

 

The same monster, "lintwurm", appeared on the medieval seals of the bishops of Worms, and was a motif familiar for its citizens. According to English archaeologist Charles Boutell, a lindworm is basically "a dragon without wings." Lindwurms can be found on coat-of-arms of many German towns, and in art.

Art historian Ilia Rodov of Bar-Ilan University notes that "Juspa’s tale is a version of the popular German legend relating that the dragon of Worms was slain by Siegfried. This legend appeared by the turn of the thirteenth century in the chapter “How Siegfried Came to Worms” of the Nibelung epos." He also noted that the painting of Segal is very close to the description of serpent from Juspa's book, and that "[t]he Jerusalem-Worms contraposition in synagogue art is known to us as Hayim Segal’s exclusive innovation. Much more frequent in east-European synagogue art were expressions of the antithesis ‘Jerusalem versus Babylon’." The only other known depiction of such Jerusalem-Worms contraposition was on the murals in the synagogue of Kopys, also made by Chaim Segal, that were a copies of the murals from Mogilev.

Wischnitzer published several articles about the Mogilev synagogue and interpretation of Segal's murals. Writing about Worms and Jerusalem on the opposite section of the ceiling and the sailboats depicted near these cities, she called it "an illustration of the legend about Jewish sages from Worms who declined an invitation by Ezra to return to Jerusalem with the exiles who were returning from Babylon after seventy years of captivity, because, they said, they were perfectly content to remain in Worms." "In other words, they preferred their well-being in exile to spiritual obligations toward the Holy Land. Juspa [the Shammes] concluded that the persecutions which the Jews of Worms suffered afterwards came as chastisement for their objection to return to the Promised Land. Hayim Segal’s terrible dragon with a red eye and a long arrow-like tongue is thus a personification of divine anger punishing the town." According to Wischnitzer, Segal had altered this story by adding a happy-ending. "The sailing vessel, which he introduced from his own imagination, denotes travel, or the eventual return of the exiles to the Holy Land. The storks - "the pious" - are shown partaking of snakes: the leviathan on which the pious will feast in the days of the Messiah. the wheeled structure is the wandering Ark of the Covenant which accompanied the Israelites on various occasions. It vanished when the First temple was destroyed; and it will reappear in the days of the Messiah. Segal ends the Worms legend on a happy note, looking to a time when no Jew will prefer exile to life in the Holy Land."

Deterioration and demolition 

In 1937 Belarusian Soviet writers Jurka Vićbič and Źmitrok Biadula visited Mogilev; they found the Cold Synagogue in deteriorated state. Religious life was persecuted under the Soviet regime, and a lot of religious building were either destroyed or used as warehouses. The article that Vićbič wrote about the synagogue in 1971, "It was in Mogilev" ("Она была в Могилёве"), is the only known testimony of the latest days of the synagogue.

Gallery

Notes

References

Sources

External links 

 Photos from the synagogue at The Bezalel Narkiss Index of Jewish Art, Center for Jewish Art, Hebrew University of Jerusalem.
 3D reconstruction of the synagogue
 About the synagogue at lostmural.org

Wooden synagogues
17th-century synagogues
Buildings and structures in Mogilev